Johan Cloete (born 21 July 1971) is a South African cricket umpire. He was a member of ICC International Panel of Umpires before being removed from the Panel in July 2016. He has stood in 60 One Day Internationals and 23 Twenty20 Internationals till date.

He was selected as one of the twenty umpires to stand in matches during the 2015 Cricket World Cup and officiated in three matches as an on-field umpire during the tournament. He is part of Cricket South Africa's umpire panel for first-class matches.

See also
 List of One Day International cricket umpires
 List of Twenty20 International cricket umpires

References

External links
Johan Cloete at ESPNcricinfo
Johan Cloete at CricketArchive

1971 births
Living people
South African One Day International cricket umpires
South African Twenty20 International cricket umpires